The 2009 Campeonato Ecuatoriano de Fútbol de la Serie A was the 51st season of the Serie A, Ecuador's premier football league. The season began on January 31 and ended on December 7. Deportivo Quito successfully defended their title for their fourth overall.

Owing to a change in sponsorship from Pilsener to Credife, the tournament will be called the Copa Credife Serie A for the next three years until 2011.

Format
For 2009, a new format was introduced and approved by Ecuadorian Football Federation. The new tournament was divided into four stages, as opposed to the usual three. All matches were scheduled to be played on Sundays, but some were moved at the clubs' requests.

The First Stage was a double round-robin tournament in which the twelve teams played against each other teams twice: once at home and once away. At the end of the stage, the top-four teams with the most points qualified to the Third Stage; the top three earned bonus points (3, 2, & 1 respectively). The top-two teams also qualified to the 2009 Copa Sudamericana.

In the Second Stage, the teams were divided into two groups of six. Groups were formed by draw, but did not have no more than one team from each provincial organization (the exception being Pichincha). The teams played within their groups in a double round-robin tournament and in a local derby. The derbies were played on the third and seventh match day of the stage.

Clásicos
Pichincha team 1 vs. Pichincha team 3
Pichincha team 2 vs. Pichincha team 4
Guayas team 1 vs. Guayas team 2
Manabí team 1 vs. Manabí team 2
Tungurahua team 1 vs. Tungurahua team 2
Azuay team vs. Chimborazo team
At the end of this stage, the two-top teams from each group qualified to the Third Stage; the top team in each group earned one bonus point for the Third Stage. The two teams with the fewest points in the First and Second Stage aggregate table were relegated to the Serie B for the next season.

In the Third Stage, the eight qualified teams were placed into two groups of four depending on their position on the aggregate table.
Group 1: 1st, 4th, 5th, 8th
Group 2: 2nd, 3rd, 6th, 7th
The top two teams from each group will advance to the Fourth Stage.

The Fourth Stage will consist of two head-to-head match-ups: one by the top-finisher of each group in the Third Stage, and the other by the runners-up. The match between the top finishers in the Third Stage will determine the national champion; the other will determine who finished third and fourth. The national champion, runner-up, and third-place finisher will each have a berth in the 2010 Copa Libertadores. The Ecuador 1 berth will go to the national champion, Ecuador 2 will go to the runner-up, and Ecuador 3 to the third-place finisher.

Teams
Twelve teams competed in the 2009 Serie A season, ten of whom remained from the 2008 season. Deportivo Azogues and Universidad Católica were relegated last season to the Serie B after accumulating the fewest points in the First and Second Stage aggregate table. They were replaced by Manta and LDU Portoviejo, the 2008 Serie B winner and runner-up, respectively. This was Manta's second spell and second season in the Serie A, having previously played in the 2003 season. LDU Portoviejo were playing in their 22nd season in the league. Their last appearance was in 2001.

Managerial changes

First stage
The first stage ran from January 31 to July 12. The top-two teams qualified to the 2009 Copa Sudamericana. The top-four teams qualified to the Third Stage.

Standings

Results

Second stage
The Second Stage began on July 19 and ended on October 3. The top-two teams from each group qualified to the Third Stage.

Group 1

Standings

Results

Group 2

Standings

Results

Inter-group clásicos
{| class="wikitable"
|-
!width=250| Home Team
!width=50| Results
!width=250| Away Team
|-
!colspan=3| El Clásico del Astillero
|-

|-

|-
!colspan=3| El Clásico Capitalino
|-

|-

|-
!colspan=3| El Clásico de las Fuerzas del Orden
|-

|-

|-
!colspan=3| El Clásico Manabita
|-

|-

|-
!colspan=3| El Clásico Ambateño
|-

|-

|-
!colspan=3| El Clásico del Austro
|-

|-

Source:1. The match was played at Estadio Monumental Banco Pichincha in Guayaquil.Colours: Blue=home team win; Yellow=draw; Red=away team win.

Aggregate table

Third stage
The Third Stage began on October 16 and is scheduled to end on November 22. The winners of each group will advance to the Fourth Stage to contest the national title. Both teams will have earned a berth to the 2010 Copa Libertadores and enter in the Second Stage of the competition (their exact berths will be determined in the Fourth Stage). The group runners-up will also advance to the Fourth Stage to contest the third-place match.

Group 1

Standings

Results

Group 2

Standings

Results

Fourth stage
The Fourth Stage will consists of two playoffs. The legs of the playoffs will be played on November 29 and December 7.

Third-place playoff
The third-place playoff will be contested between the runners-up of each Third Stage group for a berth in the 2010 Copa Libertadores First Stage.

Championship playoff
The championship playoff will be contested between the winners of each Third Stage group for the national title. Both teams will have already earned a berth in the 2010 Copa Libertadores Second Stage, but their exact berth will be determined here.

Top goalscorers

Awards
The awards were selected by the Asociación Ecuatoriana de Radiodifusión.
Best player: Marcelo Elizaga (Emelec)
Best goalkeeper: Marcelo Elizaga (Emelec)
Best defender: Marcelo Fleitas (Emelec)
Best midfielder: Giancarlo Ramos (Deportivo Cuenca)
Best striker: Claudio Bieler (LDU Quito)
Best young player: Joao Rojas (Emelec)
Best manager: Paúl Vélez (Deportivo Cuenca)
Best Ecuadorian playing abroad: Antonio Valencia (Manchester United)
Best referee: Carlos Vera

Statistics
Statistics were compiled by Quito-based newspaper El Comercio.

See also
 2009 in Ecuadorian football
 2009 Copa Libertadores
 2009 Copa Sudamericana
 2009 Recopa Sudamericana

References

External links
Official website 

2009
Ecu
Football